The women's 200 m time trial competition in track speed skating at the 2022 World Games took place on 8 July 2022 at the Birmingham CrossPlex in Birmingham, United States.

Competition format
A total of 15 athletes entered the competition. Every athlete competed in the qualifying round, from which the top 8 advanced to the final.

Results

Qualification

Final

References 

Women's 200m time trial